Rolando Aarons (born 16 November 1995) is a Jamaican professional footballer who plays as a winger for Championship club Huddersfield Town and the Jamaica national team. He has had previous loan spells with Hellas Verona in Italy, Slovan Liberec in the Czech Republic and Scottish club Motherwell, and in England with Sheffield Wednesday and Wycombe Wanderers.

Club career

Newcastle United 
Aarons joined Newcastle United in 2012 after being released by his home town club Bristol City. He made his reserve team debut on 8 February 2013 against Stoke City and scored in his second reserve game against Crystal Palace 17 days later.

Aarons travelled with the Newcastle squad to their game against Fulham. He was not included in the matchday squad as the Magpies lost 1–0. Reserves teammate Ľubomír Šatka also travelled with the squad for the first time.

On 1 April 2014, Aarons signed a professional contract with Newcastle United.

2014–15 season
Aarons had an impressive pre-season prior to the 2014–15 season, scoring one goal and creating one assist in the 2014 Schalke 04 Cup against Bundesliga team Schalke. Shortly after, he was allocated the number 16 shirt. On 17 August 2014, he made his Premier League debut in their first match of the campaign, replacing Yoan Gouffran for the final 16 minutes of a 2–0 home defeat to Manchester City. He scored his first senior goal in the 3–3 draw with Crystal Palace on 30 August. He also set up teammate Mike Williamson for Newcastle's third goal in the same match, striking the post with his own effort. His contribution to the match was described by The Guardian as "thrillingly incisive". Aarons came back from England U20 duty with a hamstring injury; scans in mid-September determined that it would take around six weeks for the injury to heal. On 29 October, Aarons returned from injury to score his second goal for the club in the fourth round of the League Cup, opening the scoring in Newcastle's 2–0 away victory over holders Manchester City. In early November, Aarons suffered a recurrence of his hamstring injury, ruling him out for another month.

Loans
In 2018, Aarons spent time out on loan with Hellas Verona under Fabio Pecchia, Benítez's former assistant at Newcastle, and Slovan Liberec. After 13 appearances in all competitions for the Czech side, he returned to Newcastle in December 2018. On 31 January 2019, deadline day for the winter transfer window, he signed for Sheffield Wednesday on loan until the end of the season.

Aarons signed for Wycombe Wanderers on 2 September 2019 on a short-term loan. The loan spell came to an end on 12 January 2020.

On 31 January 2020, Aarons moved on loan to Scottish Premiership club Motherwell for the remainder of the season. But on 31 May 2020 Aarons's loan spell ended with the Scottish outfit.

Huddersfield Town 
On 7 January 2021, Aarons signed for Huddersfield Town on a two and a half year deal for an undisclosed fee. He made his debut for the club two days later in a 3–2 FA Cup Third Round loss to Plymouth Argyle, coming off the substitutes' bench to replace Pat Jones. A week later, he made his Championship debut for Huddersfield, playing 62 minutes in a 2–1 defeat to Watford, before being replaced by Jones.

Motherwell (loan)
On 30 August 2022, Aarons returned to Motherwell on loan having spent time with the club in 2020. On 2 November 2022, his loan was cancelled due to injury.

International career 
Aarons is eligible to represent either England or Jamaica at international level. In August 2014, he received his first call-up to the England U20 team, marking his debut with the opening goal in a 6–0 friendly match win over Romania on 5 September. His club manager Alan Pardew confirmed that, despite interest from Jamaica, he intended to pursue an international future within the England set-up.

In May 2022, he received his first call-up to the Jamaica squad for their CONCACAF Nations League fixtures against Suriname and Mexico. He would make his debut as a substitute against Suriname on 7 June 2022 at Kingston National Stadium.

Style of play 
Aarons operates on the outside of midfield or as a winger, usually on the left side. He is left-footed and known for his injections of pace and technical ability. He has been compared to Chelsea winger Raheem Sterling in his playing style and in his descent; both are Jamaican-born English players.

Personal life
Aarons was born in Kingston, Jamaica, and migrated to England at the age of five to join his mother, who was living in Bristol. He is the cousin of Norwich City player Max Aarons.

Career statistics

Club

International
As of 15 June 2022.

References

External links

 Newcastle United F.C. profile
 Rolando Aarons profile at the Football Association
 
 

1995 births
Living people
Sportspeople from Kingston, Jamaica
English footballers
England youth international footballers
Jamaican footballers
English sportspeople of Jamaican descent
Jamaican emigrants to the United Kingdom
Bristol City F.C. players
Newcastle United F.C. players
Hellas Verona F.C. players
FC Slovan Liberec players
Sheffield Wednesday F.C. players
Wycombe Wanderers F.C. players
Motherwell F.C. players
Huddersfield Town A.F.C. players
Premier League players
English Football League players
Serie A players
Scottish Professional Football League players
Association football midfielders
Expatriate footballers in Italy
Expatriate footballers in the Czech Republic
Black British sportsmen
Czech First League players